LeShaun V. Sims (born September 18, 1993) is an American football cornerback who is a free agent. He played college football at Southern Utah and was drafted in the fifth round of the 2016 NFL Draft by the Tennessee Titans.

Early life
Sims was born in Las Vegas on September 18, 1993 to parents Levell and Vonda Sims. Sims attended Las Vegas (NV) Andre Agassi Prep, where he earned second-team all-state honors as a wide receiver and defensive back. As a senior, he tallied 52 tackles and a team-leading six interceptions on defense. On offense, he produced more than 400 receiving yards and five receiving touchdowns while rushing for 170 yards and another score.

Prior to Sims, no prior student-athlete from Andre Agassi Prep in Las Vegas, Nev., had ever earned an athletic scholarship. When he was a high school freshman, the Stars played eight-man football in the public charter school’s first year with a football team. They moved to 11-man football during his sophomore year, and by his senior season, the team won a league title.

College career
Sims played college football at Southern Utah University. In four seasons at Southern Utah, he appeared in 47 total games with 46 starts, including starts in every game during his final three seasons. Sims's career totals included 220 tackles, eight interceptions, 27 passes defensed, one forced fumble, five fumble recoveries and four tackles for loss. Sims graduated in April 2016 with a degree in exercise science.

Professional career

At the 2016 Southern Utah University Pro Day, Sims jumped 10 feet, 7 inches in the broad jump and ran 6.84 seconds in the three-cone shuttle. Sims was drafted by the Tennessee Titans in the fifth round (157th overall) in the 2016 NFL Draft.

Tennessee Titans

2016 season
On May 9, 2016, Sims signed a four-year contract with the Titans. He recorded his first NFL interception in Week 15 against the Kansas City Chiefs. In that game, Pro Football Focus rated Sims the highest game grade of that game. In his rookie year, Sims played in 13 games and started in two of them.

Sims finished his rookie year with 22 tackles, 3 pass deflections, 2 fumble recoveries, an interception, and six special teams tackles.

2017 season
Sims entered the 2017 season as one of the starting cornerbacks for the Titans as the team's third cornerback behind rookie Adoree' Jackson and veteran Logan Ryan.

In Week 2 against the Jacksonville Jaguars, Sims recorded a forced fumble in a 37-16 road victory. On December 3, 2017, Sims recorded an interception late in the fourth quarter against the Houston Texans which sealed the win for the Titans. He was placed on injured reserve on December 22, 2017, after suffering a hamstring injury in practice.

Sims finished his second professional season with a career-high 36 tackles, 3 pass deflections, a forced fumble, an interception, and a career-high seven special teams tackles.

2018 season
Sims was demoted to a backup role after the Titans signed Malcolm Butler. Despite this, Sims played in all 16 games for the first time in his career and started in two of them after starting cornerback Logan Ryan suffered a season-ending leg injury in Week 15 as the Titans shut out the New York Giants by a score of 17-0.

Sims finished the 2018 season with 22 tackles.

2019 season
For the first half of the season, Sims's role was similar to that of the previous season. After starting cornerback Malcolm Butler suffered a season-ending wrist injury in a Week 9 30-20 road loss against the Carolina Panthers, Sims became a starter. However, after the team signed Tramaine Brock prior to the Week 14 matchup against the Oakland Raiders, Sims returned to a backup role. During Week 15 against the Houston Texans, Sims returned a punt for 11 yards as the Titans lost 24-21.

Cincinnati Bengals
On March 31, 2020, Sims signed with the Cincinnati Bengals.

In Week 3 against the Philadelphia Eagles, Sims recorded his first interception as a Bengal during the 23–23 tie game.  He finished the season playing in 13 games with 10 starts, recording a career-high 52 tackles, four passes defensed, and one interception.

NFL statistics

Regular season

Postseason

Personal life
Sims is a movie buff who lists Training Day among his all-time favorites. He was commonly referred to as "Swis" in college because for his first college game the name on the back of his jersey was upside down. The nickname stuck.

References

External links
 Tennessee Titans bio
 Southern Utah Thunderbirds bio

1993 births
Living people
Sportspeople from Las Vegas
Players of American football from Nevada
American football cornerbacks
Southern Utah Thunderbirds football players
Tennessee Titans players
Cincinnati Bengals players